Robbie Morris (born 20 February 1982 in Hertford, England) is a former rugby union player. His position of choice was as a prop, and he could play at tighthead or loosehead.

Having started out at local club Hertford RFC, Morris went on to play for the Northampton Saints, starting in 2000. While with the Saints, he made two appearances for the England team as part of their squad in the 2003 Six Nations Championship, before leaving to play for the Newcastle Falcons in 2005. After two years there he moved abroad, joining Irish province Connacht. In 2010, however, Morris retired early from rugby, aged only 28. He was forced to retire due to an injury to his back.

References

External links
Connacht profile
Newcastle profile
England profile

1982 births
Living people
Bath Rugby players
Connacht Rugby players
England international rugby union players
English rugby union players
Rugby union players from Hertford
Rugby union props